Jorge Daniel Fossati Lurachi (born 22 November 1952 in Montevideo) is a Uruguayan football manager and former player who played as a goalkeeper. He is the current manager of Peruvian club Universitario.

Club career
Fossati played mainly in Peñarol. While playing at Peñarol, he helped the club win five league titles. He also had spells in Argentina with Independiente and Rosario Central, in Chile with Green Cross Temuco (currently Deportes Temuco) and with Brazilian team Coritiba.

He played for Mandiyú de Corrientes, of Argentina in 1987 and in 1988, and respectively played for Brazilian clubs Avaí in 1989, and Coritiba in 1990.

Managerial career
Having played as a goalkeeper during his footballing tenure, Fossati states that he had the opportunity to view matches through the perspective of a spectator and the ability to interpret the plays. He began coaching his teammates as a goalkeeper, under the supervision of the coach. As he aged, he started to write analyses of the games and coaches, noting which facets he would have adjusted.

After retiring as a player, Fossati decided to take up management. In the beginning, he had spells in charge of River Plate Montevideo Peñarol and Danubio F.C. in Uruguay. He also had spells as manager of Colón de Santa Fe in Argentina, Cerro Porteño in Paraguay and LDU Quito in Ecuador.

He became manager of the Uruguay National team in 2004. He coached Al-Sadd in Qatar and after winning all four domestic titles with them, was unveiled as the new Qatari national team manager in 2007. In late 2008, it was announced that he would undergo surgery. Subsequently, the Qatar FA ended their cooperation with Fossati, who supposedly needed too long to recover from surgery.

In 2009, Fossati signed with LDU Quito from Ecuador to manage the team for the second time.
He helped LDU Quito win the Recopa Sudamericana 2009 matches against Sport Club Internacional de Porto Alegre. LDU Quito won both games of the Recopa 1–0 and 3–0, respectively. This gave LDU Quito their second international title. After that he led them in the 2009 Peace Cup held in Spain. LDU were drawn in Group B, along with Spanish giants Real Madrid and Saudi outfit Al-Ittihad. Although LDU won defeated Al-Ittihad 3–1 in their first game, they bowed out of the competition after losing 2–4 to Real Madrid, a match which saw Cristiano Ronaldo's first goal for Real Madrid.

After Internacional and Mário Sergio parted ways, as per their previous agreement, the Brazilian club turned to the foreign market in South America and reached a deal with Fossati. He is fluent in Portuguese and lived in Brazil during the 1980s. On 13 December 2009, Fossati left LDU Quito to join Internacional for one year, Following negative results, Fossati was fired from Sport Club Internacional on 28 May after a long meeting with club officials. After that, he was named as head coach of Al-Shabab and was nearly reached last season's AFC Champions League semi-finals with the team. He was sacked by Al-Shabab in December 2010, but returned for another crack at the continental title, after being put in charge of Al-Sadd for a second time between 2010 and 2012 and won the Asian Championship in 2011 in a dramatic campaign. He left Al-Sadd on 19 May 2012 and joined Club Cerro Porteño after just 24 hours.

On 26 July 2013, he signed a two years contract with United Arab Emirates champions Al Ain to replace with Cosmin Olăroiu.

He became coach of the Qatar national football team in 2016. Like Fossati, all of the football management of 'The Maroons' were Uruguayan.

In June 2019, the River Plate Athletic Club of Uruguay asked for help, and that the club take command, in order to resurface it, in four months it led the club to a significant improvement in football.

Honours

Player

Club
Peñarol
 Uruguayan Primera División: 1973, 1974, 1975, 1978, 1979

Olimpia
 Paraguayan Primera División: 1983

Rosario Central
 Argentine Primera División: 1986–87

Avaí
 Campeonato Catarinense: 1988

Manager

Club
Peñarol
 Uruguayan Primera División: 1996

LDU Quito
 Ecuadorian Serie A: 2003
 Recopa Sudamericana: 2009
 Copa Sudamericana: 2009

Al-Sadd
 Qatar Stars League: 2006–07
 Emir Cup: 2007
 Crown Prince Cup: 2006, 2007
 Sheikh Jassem Cup: 2007
 AFC Champions League: 2011

Cerro Porteño
 Paraguayan Primera División: 2012

Al-Rayyan
 Qatar Stars League: 2015–16

International
Uruguay
 Copa América third place: 2004

References

1952 births
Living people
Uruguayan footballers
Uruguayan expatriate footballers
Uruguayan football managers
Footballers from Montevideo
Central Español players
Rampla Juniors players
Peñarol players
Deportes Temuco footballers
Club Atlético Independiente footballers
Rosario Central footballers
Millonarios F.C. players
Club Olimpia footballers
Textil Mandiyú footballers
Avaí FC players
Coritiba Foot Ball Club players
Uruguayan Primera División players
Chilean Primera División players
Argentine Primera División players
Primera Nacional players
Categoría Primera A players
Paraguayan Primera División players
Association football goalkeepers
Qatar national football team managers
River Plate Montevideo managers
Peñarol managers
Danubio F.C. managers
2004 Copa América managers
Al Sadd SC managers
Club Atlético Colón managers
L.D.U. Quito managers
Cerro Porteño managers
Sport Club Internacional managers
Uruguay national football team managers
Club Universitario de Deportes managers
Expatriate footballers in Argentina
Expatriate footballers in Brazil
Expatriate footballers in Chile
Expatriate footballers in Colombia
Expatriate footballers in Paraguay
Uruguayan expatriate football managers
Expatriate football managers in Argentina
Expatriate football managers in Brazil
Expatriate football managers in Ecuador
Expatriate football managers in Qatar
Expatriate football managers in Paraguay
Expatriate football managers in Saudi Arabia
Uruguayan expatriate sportspeople in Argentina
Uruguayan expatriate sportspeople in Brazil
Uruguayan expatriate sportspeople in Chile
Uruguayan expatriate sportspeople in Colombia
Uruguayan expatriate sportspeople in Ecuador
Uruguayan expatriate sportspeople in Qatar
Uruguayan expatriate sportspeople in Paraguay
Uruguayan expatriate sportspeople in Saudi Arabia
Uruguayan sportspeople of Italian descent
Al Shabab FC (Riyadh) managers
Expatriate football managers in the United Arab Emirates
Al Ain FC managers
Campeonato Brasileiro Série A managers
Uruguayan Primera División managers
Saudi Professional League managers
Uruguay international footballers